Louis Henry Simon (20 May 1874 – 2 December 1926) was a French industrialist, a radical socialist, who was a deputy from 1910 to 1926, and Minister of the Colonies from 1917 to 1920.

Early years

Louis Henry Simon was born on 20 May 1874 in Labruguière, Tarn.
He was an industrialist and radical socialist.
He was elected deputy for the 1st district of Castres, Tarn on 8 May 1910 in the second round.
He joined the committees on economies and on Foreign Affairs, Protectorates & Colonies.
He was narrowly reelected in the 1914 elections, and joined the committees on Foreign Affairs, Protectorates & Colonies, on Budget and on Education & Fine Arts.
At the start of World War I (1914–18) Simon was called up for military service as a sergeant in the 127th Territorial Infantry Regiment. 
On 9 February 1915 he was promoted to lieutenant and assigned to the 39th Infantry Regiment.

Minister of Colonies

Simon was appointed Minister of the Colonies in the second cabinet of Georges Clemenceau, and held office from 16 November 1917 to 18 January 1920.
His two main thrusts were to develop the colonial economies and to maintain banks in the colonies with the right of issue.
At the start of March 1919 Simon met Lord Milner of Britain to discuss dividing up the German colonies. 
He made a request for all of Togo, but settled on just getting Lomé and the railways.
He was less willing to cede territory from Cameroon, although he was willing to let the British have all of German Borno.
On the question of land redistribution in the Middle East Simon delegated responsibility to members of a commission.
At the Versailles Peace Conference Simon opposed the new colonies that France had acquired from Germany being administered as mandates.

Later career

In the elections of 1919 Simon was elected for the Parti républicain radical et radical socialiste at the head of the list for the Union démocratique républicaine.
He joined to committees on Foreign Affairs and on Customs.
During this period he became president of the General Council.
He was reelected in 1924.
He died unexpectedly in Paris on 2 December 1926.

Notes

Sources

1874 births
1926 deaths
People from Tarn (department)
Politicians from Occitania (administrative region)
Radical Party (France) politicians
French Ministers of the Colonies
Members of the 10th Chamber of Deputies of the French Third Republic
Members of the 11th Chamber of Deputies of the French Third Republic
Members of the 12th Chamber of Deputies of the French Third Republic
Members of the 13th Chamber of Deputies of the French Third Republic